Stephen John Hatter (born 21 October 1958 in East Ham, Greater London) is an English former professional footballer who played in the Football League, as a central defender.

References

Sources

1958 births
Living people
Footballers from East Ham
English footballers
Association football defenders
Fulham F.C. players
Exeter City F.C. players
Wimbledon F.C. players
Southend United F.C. players
Chelmsford City F.C. players
Wealdstone F.C. players
Grays Athletic F.C. players
Maidstone United F.C. (1897) players
Barking F.C. players
English Football League players
National League (English football) players